Marko Kolsi (born 20 January 1985) is a Finnish footballer who plays for Vantaan Jalkapalloseura.

Career
Kolsi, a midfielder, joined Willem II in the summer of 2004 after previously playing for FC Jokerit in the Finnish Veikkausliiga. He left the Dutch club in 2006 and joined TOP Oss, and later FC Eindhoven. In summer 2007 he went to Slovenia where he played for NK Maribor and NK Rudar Velenje in the Slovenian PrvaLiga. Kolsi made a brief return to his old club Willem II in January 2012, before returning to Slovenia, signing for NK Celje for the 2012–13 season.

He was part of the Finnish under-17 team at the 2002 UEFA European Under-17 Football Championship.

References

External links
 Player profile at Football Association of Finland 
 Player profile at PrvaLiga 
 

1985 births
Living people
Sportspeople from Vantaa
Finnish footballers
Finland youth international footballers
Finland under-21 international footballers
Association football midfielders
FC Jokerit players
Willem II (football club) players
TOP Oss players
FC Eindhoven players
NK Maribor players
NK Rudar Velenje players
NK Šmartno 1928 players
NK Celje players
Käpylän Pallo players
FC Honka players
Veikkausliiga players
Eredivisie players
Slovenian PrvaLiga players
Finnish expatriate footballers
Expatriate footballers in the Netherlands
Finnish expatriate sportspeople in the Netherlands
Expatriate footballers in Slovenia